The Noron were a political faction of the Joseon Dynasty in Korea. They consisted of the supporters of Song Siyeol after the split of the Westerners. The Noron suffered setbacks with Kim Seok-ju's death in 1684 and Song's execution in 1689. In 1701, Queen Inhyeon, who favored the Noron, died. They were favored by King Yeongjo, who came to the throne in 1724.

Members
Song Siyeol
Kim Seok-ju
Kim Jo-sun

See also
Sukjong of Joseon
Gyeongjong of Joseon
Yeongjo of Joseon
Jeongjo of Joseon
Yi San (TV series)
Dong Yi (TV series)
Haechi (TV series)

References

Joseon dynasty
Political history of Korea